Zelaya may refer to:

Celaya, a city in Mexico
Zelaya Department, a former department of Nicaragua
Zelaya, Buenos Aires, a settlement in Pilar Partido in Argentina
Zelaya (surname)